Hostel Returns is a sequel to the 2013 Nepali film Hostel and is based on the hostel life of typical engineering students in Nepal.
Directed by Suraj Bhusal and produced by Mr Sunil Rawal, Sunil himself plays the role of Hostel Warden in the movie. In addition, young actors and actresses viz Sushil Shrestha (Pratap), Sashi Shrestha (Seema), Nazir Hussain (Rameshwor), Swostima Khadka (Elina) etc. are starred in the movie.

Plot 
Hostel Returns is a 2015 Nepalese teen romance film directed by Suraj Bhusal and produced by Sunil Rawal under Durgish Films banner. This film is a sequel to 2013 film Hostel and is based on the hostel life of civil engineering students.which is inspired from bollywood movie 3 idiots. Despite being the sequel of Hostel, no previous stars are cast on this film. In fact, the film stars new faces of Najir Hussain, Sushil Shrestha, Sashi Shrestha, Swastima Khadka, Sushil Sitaula, jenny shrestha and Abhaya Baral.

The film was originally set to release on 8 May 2015 but due to devastating Nepal earthquake that struck on 25 April 2015, the crew postponed the date of release. It was then released on Bhadra 4 (August 21, 2015).

Cast and crew
Sushil Shrestha  as Pratap Raj Bhandari
Abhaya Baral as Kumar Prasai
Sushil Sitaula as Sameer Bhatta
Najir Hussain as Rameshwor Yadav
Sashi Shrestha as Seema Joshi
Swastima Khadka as Elina Khadka
 Rajendra Moktan Colorist
Uttam Neupane Sound mixer, Sound designer
Sunil Rawal as warden
jenny shrestha as pratikshya sharma
 Deeya Maskey as teacher (Special appearance)

Music

Track listing

Promotion

Promotion of Hostel Returns was different from other promotions. Publicity designer of movie is Dipesh Khadka. The film crew launched live promo with the actors acting live in front of students in various colleges. The team targets students as audience since the film is itself about engineering students and their parents.

Reception

The premiere show of Hostel Returns was held in Australia on 19 August 2015. The film was then released in Nepal on 21 August 2015. Hostel returns had an aggressive opening. The occupancy of the show was 80%, beating Bollywood film, All Is Well.

The film earned 1 crore 1 lakh gross in just two days.

See also 
Hostel (2013 film)
Saayad
Nepal earthquake

References

External links

 
Hostel Returns Nepali Movie 2015

Nepalese romantic comedy films
Films shot in Kathmandu
Nepalese sequel films
2015 romantic comedy films
Nepalese coming-of-age films
2010s Nepali-language films